Alexander Dundas Ross Cochrane-Wishart-Baillie, 1st Baron Lamington (24 November 1816 – 15 February 1890), better known as Alexander Baillie-Cochrane, was a British Conservative politician perhaps best known for his association with Young England in the early 1840s.

The son of Admiral of the Fleet Sir Thomas John Cochrane, he succeeded to the Baillie estate at Lamington in 1833.

He attended Cambridge University before entering parliament as a member for Bridport in 1841. He later sat for Lanarkshire, Honiton, and finally the Isle of Wight until 1880 when he was made a peer and went to the House of Lords as Baron Lamington, of Lamington in the County of Lanark.

In 1844 he married Annabella Mary Elizabeth Drummond, daughter of Andrew Drummond of Cadlands, Hampshire and a granddaughter of John Manners, 5th Duke of Rutland. Through the marriage of Annabella's sister Frederica, he was brother-in-law to the Earl of Scarborough.

They had four children. He was succeeded in his honours and lands by his only son, Charles Wallace Alexander Napier, second baron Lamington, who was appointed Governor of Queensland in 1895. A daughter Constance Mary Elizabeth Baillie-Cochrane (1846–1929) married Reginald Windsor Sackville, 7th Earl De La Warr on 7 February 1867.

References

Sources

External links

 

Lamington, Alexander Cochrane-Wishart-Baillie, 1st Baron
Lamington, Alexander Cochrane-Wishart-Baillie, 1st Baron
Scottish Tory MPs (pre-1912)
Conservative Party (UK) MPs for English constituencies
Members of the Parliament of the United Kingdom for Scottish constituencies
Lamington, Alexander Cochrane-Wishart-Baillie, 1st Baron
UK MPs 1841–1847
UK MPs 1852–1857
UK MPs 1859–1865
UK MPs 1865–1868
UK MPs 1868–1874
UK MPs 1874–1880
UK MPs who were granted peerages
Members of Parliament for the Isle of Wight
Lamington, Alexander Baillie-Cochrane, 1st Baron
Alexander
Presidents of the Cambridge Union
Members of the Parliament of the United Kingdom for Honiton
Peers of the United Kingdom created by Queen Victoria